Lachin is a city in Azerbaijan.

Lachin may also refer to:
 Lachin, Kermanshah
 Lachin, West Azerbaijan

Distinguish from

Lachine (disambiguation)